Metro Transit Police may refer to:

Metro Transit Police Department in Washington, D.C.
Metropolitan Transit Police of Metro Transit in Minneapolis-St. Paul

See also 
Metro Transit (disambiguation)